Caroline Groot (born 4 September 1997) is a Dutch Paralympic cyclist who competes in C5 classification. She made her maiden Paralympic appearance during the 2020 Summer Paralympics.

Career 
Caroline claimed gold medal in C5 scratch race at the 2018 UCI Para-cycling Track World Championships.

She pulled off a major upset at the 2019 UCI Para-cycling Track World Championships where she beat much fancied British veteran cyclist Sarah Storey to claim gold medal in the women's 500m time trial event. She retained her title in the 500m time trial C5 event at the 2020 UCI Para-cycling Track World Championships with a timing of 36.159.

She represented Netherlands at the 2020 Summer Paralympics and competed in women's C4-5 where she claimed a bronze medal. She also set a new world record in women's C5 500m time trial with a record timing of 35.599 to she win the bronze medal.

References 

1997 births
Living people
Dutch female cyclists
Cyclists at the 2020 Summer Paralympics
Paralympic cyclists of the Netherlands
Paralympic bronze medalists for the Netherlands
Medalists at the 2020 Summer Paralympics
Paralympic medalists in cycling
People from Andijk
Cyclists from North Holland
21st-century Dutch women